A list of films produced in Brazil in 1945:

See also
 1945 in Brazil

External links
Brazilian films of 1945 at the Internet Movie Database

Brazil
1945
Films